Ardeha (also Romanized as Ardehā, Ardahā or Ardaha) is a village in Molla Yaqub Rural District of the Central District of Sarab County, East Azerbaijan province, Iran. At the 2006 National Census, its population was 1,677 in 395 households. The following census in 2011 counted 1,691 people in 466 households. The latest census in 2016 showed a population of 1,647 people in 503 households; it was the largest village in its rural district.

References 

Sarab County

Populated places in East Azerbaijan Province

Populated places in Sarab County